Agnikankan: Branded Oath (Burning Symbol) also called The Branded Oath, is a 1932 Marathi adventure film directed by V. Shantaram. The film was a Prabhat Film Company production and was a bilingual, called Jalti Nishani (Burning Symbol) in Hindi. The cinematography was done by Keshavrao Dhaiber and Art direction by S. Fatehlal. The sound direction was by Vishnupant Govind Damle and the music and lyrics were by Govindrao Tembe. Dialogues for the movie are written by Govindrao Tembe. The character artist Gajanan Jagirdar began his career in films by acting the role of a seventy-five-year-old man at the age of twenty-five. The cast included Shankarrao Bhosle, Kamala Devi, Master Vinayak, Baburao Pendharkar, Nimbalkar and Jagirdar.

Plot
Senapati Naagraya (Baburao Pendharkar) rebels against the Raja of Vaijayanti (Shankarrao Bhosale), overthrows his army and kills him, but is unable to stop Rani Veermati (Kamaladevi), who escapes along with her infant son, Sudhirchandra (Master Vinayak). For 19 years she remains in hiding, branding her arm with a burning iron every year. When her son is 20, she asks him to promise to take back Vaijayanti or else she will brand her arm for the 20th time. He promises to punish the tyrant and take charge of this region in 10 days, and accordingly travels there in the company of his friend, Bhairav (Budasaheb). Once there, they prepare to meet with the Minister (Nimbalkar), who is secretly rebelling against Naagraya. What Sudhirchandra does not know is that Naagraya has decided to wed the Minister's nubile daughter (Leela Pendharkar), and that she will be involved in snaring him in a deceptive plot to have him arrested, tortured and killed.

Cast
 Shankarrao Bhosle as Raja
 Kamaladevi as Rani Veermati
 Master Vinayak as Rajkumar Sudhirchandra
 Budasaheb as Bhairav (Prince's Friend)
 Nimbalkar as Minister Mantri
 Leela Chandragiri as Mantri's daughter
 Baburao Pendharkar as Commander Raja Naagraya
 Jagirdar

Soundtrack
The songs in the film were composed by Govindrao Tembe, with lyrics written by Govindrao Tembe.

 Marathi Soundtrack

 Hindi Soundtrack
The fifteen songs in the film were composed by Govindrao Tembe with the lyrics written by Narbada Prasad Aasi.

References

External links

1932 films
Prabhat Film Company films
Films directed by V. Shantaram
1930s Marathi-language films
1930s Hindi-language films
Indian black-and-white films
Indian adventure films
1932 adventure films
Indian multilingual films
1932 multilingual films